Çatak is a village in Silifke district of Mersin Province, Turkey. At  it is situated in the Toros Mountains. The population of Çatak  was 389  as of 2011. According to unconfirmed reports the ancestors of the village people were Çatak tribe of the Turkmen people who had migrated from Caucasus to Çatak. The main economic activity is fruit farming. Grape and grape molasses are the main products.

References

Villages in Silifke District